Books on the Delhi Metro or BODM is a not-for-profit venture started in May 2017 by the couple Shruti Sharma and Tarun Chauhan. Both Sharma and Chauhan along with the "book fairies" leave books on the Delhi Metro for travelers to pick up and read and then redrop at any metro station for other commuters to read. Books on the Delhi Metro is inspired by Hollie Fraser's Books on the Underground (Books on the Move - Global) initiative that encourages people to read on public transit and had Emma Watson, the Harry Potter star leaving books on the London Underground. After a book has been dropped off, clues on social media using #booksonthedelhimetro are left so that potential readers could locate the book. BODM was started by two people and now has many volunteers who drop books on the Delhi Metro lines.

References

Organisations based in Delhi
Non-profit organisations based in India
Mobile libraries
Delhi Metro
Literacy in India
2017 establishments in Delhi